The 1887–88 season was the fifth to be played by the team that are now known as Bristol Rovers, and their fourth playing under the name Eastville Rovers. It marked a major change in the direction of football in Gloucestershire as a County Football Association was established, enabling a formal cup competition to be played in the area for the first time.

Season review
Until 1887 Eastville Rovers had played only friendly matches, but this season began with a meeting at the Montpelier Hotel in Bristol that would change this. On 7 September 1887 W.W. Perrin and T. Channing, on behalf of Eastville Rovers, along with Charles Lacy Sweet and J. Innes-Pocock from Clifton Association and representatives from Warmley, St George, St Agnes, and Southville voted to establish the Gloucestershire County Football Association. This would enable a cup competition to be organised and enable the standardisation of the rules governing matches, which up to this point had not been the case. The delegates unanimously agreed to adopt a slightly modified version of the London Football Association rules, and to convene again a week later to elect officials for the new County FA.

Rovers were given a bye when the first round draw was made the following month, before being paired with Clifton Association in the semi-final. As the first team drawn, Eastville had the choice of where to play the match, and arranged for it to be played at the home ground of St George F.C. Unfortunately for them, Rovers lost forward Harry Horsey to injury early in the game and had to play the majority of the match with ten men, but in spite of this disadvantage it was the Eastville side who took the lead in the first half through Harry Cade. H.H. Francis scored an equaliser for Clifton shortly afterwards to make the half time score 1–1. In the second half Clifton's man advantage began to show, and aided by playing down the slope of the pitch they managed to score a further three goals, thanks to Charles Wreford-Brown, and A.B. Colthurst (x2), making the final result 4–1 to Clifton Association.

As with previous seasons, many of the team's friendly results are not known, but where final scores have been established Eastville Rovers ended the season with five wins and two defeats.

Results

First team

Gloucestershire Cup

Friendlies

Second team

Statistics
Friendly matches are not included in this section.

References

Bibliography

Bristol Rovers F.C. seasons
Eastville Rovers